

Entertainment 
 David Emge, actor Dawn of the Dead
 Crista Flanagan, actress, comedian MadTV
 Kelli Giddish, actress All My Children, "Law & Order: SVU"
 Ron Glass, actor Firefly, Barney Miller
 Deirdre Lovejoy, actress The Wire
 Rami Malek, Academy Award-winning actor The Pacific, Night at the Museum, The War at Home, Mr. Robot and Bohemian Rhapsody
 Jack McBrayer, actor 30 Rock, Forgetting Sarah Marshall
 David McFadzean producer and writer of Home Improvement and Roseanne
 Jim Michaels, producer of Supernatural, Everybody Hates Chris, and Lois & Clark: The New Adventures of Superman
 Lennon Parham, producer, director, actress Playing House
 Stephen Plunkett, actor The Mend, War Horse, The Orphans' Home Cycle
 Carrie Preston, actress, True Blood
 The Watson Twins, Musicians
 Matt Williams, producer and writer of The Cosby Show, Home Improvement, and Roseanne
 Rutina Wesley, actress True Blood

Politics
Lloyd Winnecke, 34th Mayor of Evansville

Business 
 Khalid Almolhem, Director General of Saudi Arabian Airlines

Sports 
 Marty Amsler, former National Football League defensive end
 Andy Benes, former MLB player
 Don Buse, NBA All-Star
 Jamey Carroll, former MLB player
 Alec Dufty, NY Red Bulls MLS Goal Keeper
 Cory Elenio, Columbus Crew MLS Midfielder
 Sal Fasano, MLB player
 Kyle Freeland, MLB player
 Scott Haffner, Former NBA player drafted in the 2nd round of the 1989 NBA draft
Brad Leaf, American-Israeli basketball player for Hapoel Galil Elyon and Maccabi Tel Aviv of the Israel Premier League 
 Troy Perkins, D.C. United MLS Goalkeeper
 Jerry Sloan, NBA player and Hall of Fame head coach
 David Weir, soccer player for Everton F.C., Rangers F.C., Hearts and Scotland

Sciences and Engineering 
 Richard Harbert Smith, professor and researcher of aeronautical engineering at MIT (1929/45).

Other 
 Adam Alexander, Fox Sports 1 NASCAR Host and Play-by-Play Announcer
 John B. Conaway, Lieutenant General and former Chief of National Guard Bureau
 Marilyn Durham, novelist
 Lisel Mueller, poet who won the Pulitzer Prize for Poetry in 1997
 David J. Lawson, a bishop of the United Methodist Church

References